is a Japanese politician and a member of the Diet of Japan, representing the Liberal Democratic Party until 2009. He ran in House of Councillors election in 2010 as a proportional candidate of the Sunrise Party of Japan.

Sugimura was born in Asahikawa, Hokkaidō. He attended the University of Tsukuba but dropped out in 2004.

Sugimura became the youngest member of the House of Representatives after the September 11, 2005 general election. He was not expected to win a seat, as he had been placed in 35th position on the LDP's proportional representation ticket for the Minami-Kanto bloc.

He first came to media attention for his excitement at the prospect of the range of perks available for elected politicians, including high class restaurants, first class travel on the Shinkansen, and being able to afford a BMW. 
Sugimura was reprimanded by LDP executives for his comments, and publicly apologised at a news conference on September 27, 2005, saying they had been "immature and irresponsible".

Sugimura is a character in a satirical mahjong manga Mudazumo Naki Kaikaku.

See also 
 Koizumi Children

References

External links 
  
 Official blog 

1979 births
Koizumi Children
Liberal Democratic Party (Japan) politicians
Living people
Members of the House of Representatives (Japan)
People from Asahikawa
Sunrise Party politicians
University of Tsukuba alumni